Kazimierz Górecki (January 17, 1954 - June 26, 1977) was a Polish sprint canoer who competed in the mid-1970s. He won two bronze medals at the 1974 ICF Canoe Sprint World Championships in Mexico City, earning them in the K-1 4 x 500 m and K-4 10000 m events..

Górecki also finished fifth in the K-4 1000 m event at the 1976 Summer Olympics in Montreal.

Górecki was born in Strączno. His wife, Maria, also competed as a sprint canoer in the 1970s.

References

Sports-reference.com profile.

1954 births
1977 deaths
Canoeists at the 1976 Summer Olympics
Olympic canoeists of Poland
Polish male canoeists
People from Wałcz County
ICF Canoe Sprint World Championships medalists in kayak
Sportspeople from West Pomeranian Voivodeship